Guruwar Peth is a term, in the Marathi language, for a locality within an Indian city.  Cities that include a Guruwar Peth include Pune, Solapur, Madhavnagar, Karad and Ahmednagar. The term Guruwar is derived from the day Thursday.

Guruwar Peth, Solapur
Guruwar Peth, Solapur is an area located in western Solapur city, in Maharashtra State of the Republic of India. The famous Shankarling Temple is located there.

References

Marathi language
Cities and towns in Solapur district
Cities and towns in Ahmednagar district